The 1982 Clemson Tigers football team was an American football team that represented Clemson University in the Atlantic Coast Conference (ACC) during the 1982 NCAA Division I-A football season. In its fifth season under head coach Danny Ford, the team compiled a 9–1–1 record (6–0 against conference opponents), won the ACC championship, was ranked No. 8 in the final AP Poll, and outscored opponents by a total of 289 to 147. The team played its home games at Memorial Stadium in Clemson, South Carolina.

The defending national champion, Clemson started the year with a loss to Georgia and a tie with Boston College. The team climbed back up the rankings by winning their next nine games, but the season was derailed when Clemson was placed on probation near the end of the season for recruiting violations, and was made ineligible for a bowl bid.

Lee Nanney and Willie Underwood were the team captains. The team's statistical leaders included quarterback Homer Jordan with 674 passing yards, Cliff Austin with 1,064 rushing yards and 84 points scored (14 touchdowns), and Frank Magwood with 414 receiving yards.

Schedule

Personnel

References

Clemson
Clemson Tigers football seasons
Atlantic Coast Conference football champion seasons
Clemson Tigers football